The Rolls-Royce Silver Shadow is a full-sized luxury car produced by British automaker Rolls-Royce in various forms from 1965 to 1980. It was the first of the marque to use unitary body and chassis construction.

The Silver Shadow was produced from 1965 to 1976, and the Silver Shadow II from 1977 to 1980. To date, the combined model run has the largest production volume of any Rolls-Royce.

Models

Silver Shadow
The Silver Shadow was originally intended to be called Rolls-Royce Silver Mist, but was replaced with Silver Shadow at the last minute due to Mist meaning "manure" or "crap" in German. It was designed with several modernisations in response to concerns that the company was falling behind in automotive innovation, most notably in its unitary construction.

Style-wise, the John Polwhele Blatchley design was a major departure from its predecessor, the Silver Cloud. More than 50% of Silver Clouds had been sold on the domestic market where, by the standards of much of Europe and most of North America, roads were narrow and crowded. The new Shadow was  narrower and  shorter than the Silver Cloud, but nevertheless managed to offer increased passenger and luggage space thanks to more efficient packaging made possible by unitary construction.

Other new features included disc brakes replacing drums, and independent rear suspension instead of the outdated live axle design of previous Rolls-Royce models.

The standard wheelbase Silver Shadow measured ,  and had a book price of £6,557 in the first year of production.

The Shadow featured a  6.2 L V8 from 1965 to 1969, and a  6.75 L V8 from 1970 to 1980. Both powerplants were coupled to a General Motors-sourced Turbo Hydramatic 400 automatic gearbox, except on pre-1970 right-hand-drive models, which used the same 4-speed automatic gearbox as the Silver Cloud (also sourced from General Motors, the Hydramatic).

A distinctive feature was a high-pressure hydropneumatic suspension system licensed from Citroën, with dual-circuit braking and hydraulic self-levelling suspension. At first, both the front and rear of the car were controlled by the levelling system; the front levelling was deleted in 1969 as it had been determined that the rear levelling did almost all the work. Rolls-Royce achieved a high degree of ride quality with this arrangement.

Two-door versions

A two-door saloon was introduced early in 1966, followed by a convertible in 1967. There are two different versions of the two-door saloon – one by Mulliner Park Ward featuring  style fenders, and the very rare James Young model that was only built in fifty examples (comprising 35 Rolls-Royces and 15 Bentleys). The James Young version was discontinued in 1967, leaving only the curvier Mulliner Park Ward model.

The convertible variant, by Mulliner Park Ward, was marketed as the Silver Shadow Drophead Coupé.

Silver Shadow II

In 1977, the model was renamed the Silver Shadow II in recognition of several major changes, most notably rack and pinion steering; modifications to the front suspension improved handling markedly.

Externally, the bumpers were changed from chrome to alloy and rubber starting with the late 1976 Silver Shadows. These new energy-absorbing bumpers had been used in the United States since 1974, as a response to tightening safety standards there. Nonetheless, the bumpers on cars sold outside of North America were still solidly mounted and protruded  less. Also now made standard across the board was the deletion of the small grilles mounted beneath the headlamps. Outside of North America, where tall curbs and the like demanded more ground clearance, a front skirt was also fitted to the Silver Shadow II and its sister cars.

In 1979, 75 Silver Shadow II cars were specially fitted to commemorate the 75th anniversary of the company with the original red "RR" badges front and rear, pewter/silver paint, grey leather with red piping, scarlet red carpets, and a silver commemorative placard on the inside of the glove box door. 33 75th anniversary cars were designated for and shipped to the North American market.

Derivatives

Silver Wraith II

Rolls-Royce considered offering a more exclusive, long-wheelbase Phantom VII model based on the Silver Shadow, but production was not pursued and no prototypes were built. Instead, a long-wheelbase variant, some 4 inches longer to provide additional rear seat legroom, was offered in the United States from May 1969, and available to domestic customers from early 1970. A pilot series of ten long wheelbase cars had been built in 1967 and sold, one of them to Princess Margaret. Some long-wheelbase models were fitted with a privacy glass divider. Outside of North America, the cars with a divider were fitted with a separate air conditioning unit mounted in the boot - North American safety laws made this impossible, as the petrol tank would have had to be relocated. The cars with a divider lost the entire gain in wheelbase. The glass divider was electrically retractable.

Initially, the long-wheelbase model did not have a separate name, but in 1976, with the introduction of the Silver Shadow II, the longer car was dubbed the Silver Wraith II.

The Wraith II is identified by all alterations found on the Silver Shadow II and additionally an Everflex-covered roof (also available as an option on the Silver Shadow II), a smaller, more formal rear window (some customers deleted the smaller back window: for example Joe Bamford of JCB) and different wheel covers. Some Silver Wraith IIs were also fitted with electric divisions which took up the extra four inches of leg room in the rear.

The Rolls-Royce factory built a special stretch limousine in 1979. It was ordered by Bhagwan Shree Rajneesh. The religious leader had a collection of 93 Rolls-Royce cars.

Corniche

In 1971 the Silver Shadow two door models were given the separate identity of Corniche (with either Rolls-Royce or Bentley badging), and eventually went on to outlive the Silver Shadow by some years with production lasting until 1982 for the coupé and 1996 for the convertible.

Camargue

Another coupé variant on the Shadow platform was the Camargue, with bodywork designed by the Italian firm Pininfarina, and production running from 1975 to 1986. The Camargue had the distinction of being the most expensive production Rolls-Royce.

Bentley T

A Bentley version of the Shadow, known as the Bentley T (and Bentley T2 from 1977), was also made. It was mechanically identical and differed only in the badging and design of the radiator shell. The more rounded radiator also required a slightly reshaped bonnet profile. Other modifications were only slight cosmetic ones, a different front bumper and hubcaps. Engine valve covers with a "Bentley" logo were only used when the factory had them available.

The long-wheelbase version of the Bentley T did not have a separate identity and was simply called T long-wheelbase or T2 long-wheelbase. Only a very few of these were built (9 and 10 examples respectively, less than 0.4% of the total long-wheelbase production).

All two-door cars were also available as Bentleys. However, only one example of a Bentley Camargue was ever produced.

Production statistics

Commemoration
In 2013, the Rolls-Royce Silver Shadow featured on a "British Auto Legends" postage stamp issued by the Royal Mail.

Popular culture
The Rolls-Royce Silver Shadow, and its derivatives, has appeared in film and television. The Silver Shadow appears in the James Bond film The Man with the Golden Gun (1974). It also features in the Bond film The World Is Not Enough (1999).

Silver Wraith II (1979 model) makes multiple appearances in the first season of Netflix's The Umbrella Academy. It is first very briefly revealed at the end of the series' first episode, "We Only See Each Other at Weddings and Funerals". The same vehicle later makes a clearer appearance at the end of "Number Five". It also appears in the beginning and end of "The Day That Was" and of "I Heard a Rumor". It is seen for the last time at the beginning of "Changes".

Japanese director Juzo Itami was known as an Rolls-Royce aficionado, featuring several Rolls-Royce and Bentley vehicles in his movies including a Silver Shadow in his 1984 film The Funeral, a Bentley T-series in the popular 1985 classic Tampopo, and a Silver Shadow in the 1987 film A Taxing Woman. His last personal vehicle, a Bentley Continental, is maintained at his museum in Matsuyama.

One of Princess Margaret's favorite cars was a 1980 Rolls-Royce Silver Wraith II which she owned for 22 years until her passing, with notable passengers including Paul Getty, Ronald and Nancy Reagan, Lady Diana Spencer, HM The Queen and Queen Mary, The Queen Mother.

Queen frontman Freddie Mercury, who never drove a car because he had no licence, was often chauffeured around London in his Silver Shadow from 1979 until his death in 1991. The car was passed to his sister Kashmira who made it available for display at public events, including the West End premiere of the musical We Will Rock You in 2002, before it was auctioned off at the National Exhibition Centre in Birmingham in 2013 for £74,600. In 1997, a white 1972 Rolls-Royce Silver Shadow featured on the cover of the Oasis album Be Here Now. During the photo shoot for the album, the car was lowered into the swimming pool of Stocks House, Hertfordshire.

References

Literature 
 Graham Robson: Rolls-Royce Silver Shadow: The Complete Story, 1998, .
 R. M. Clarke: Rolls-Royce Silver Shadow Ultimate Portfolio, 1999

External links

 Rolls-Royce Silver Shadow I
 Rolls-Royce Silver Shadow II
 Detailed descriptions (in German)

Rolls-Royce Silver Shadow
Rolls-Royce Silver Shadow
Silver Shadow
Rear-wheel-drive vehicles
Sedans
Limousines
Cars introduced in 1965